Rhexidius is a genus of ant-loving beetles in the family Staphylinidae. There are about 10 described species in Rhexidius.

Species
These 10 species belong to the genus Rhexidius:
 Rhexidius aggestus Schuster & Grigarick, 1962
 Rhexidius aperulus Casey
 Rhexidius asperulus Casey, 1894
 Rhexidius crenatus Schuster & Grigarick, 1962
 Rhexidius cuspidatus Schuster & Grigarick, 1962
 Rhexidius glareosus Schuster & Grigarick, 1962
 Rhexidius granulosus Casey, 1887
 Rhexidius hispidus Schuster & Grigarick, 1962
 Rhexidius impensus Schuster & Grigarick, 1962
 Rhexidius incomptus Schuster & Grigarick, 1962

References

Further reading

 
 

Pselaphinae
Articles created by Qbugbot